P. Radhakrishnan may refer to:

 P. Radhakrishnan (politician), Sri Lankan politician
 P. Radhakrishnan (scientist) (born 1943), Indian space scientist, author and speaker